Technetium compounds are chemical compounds containing the chemical element technetium. Technetium can form multiple oxidation states, but often forms in the +4 and +7 oxidation states. Because technetium is radioactive, technetium compounds are extremely rare on Earth.

Pertechnetate and derivatives

The most prevalent form of technetium that is easily accessible is sodium pertechnetate, Na[TcO4]. The majority of this material is produced by radioactive decay from [99MoO4]2−:
[99MoO4]2−  →   [99mTcO4]−  + e−
Pertechnetate (tetroxidotechnetate)  behaves analogously to perchlorate, both of which are tetrahedral. Unlike permanganate, it is only a weak oxidizing agent.

Related to pertechnetate is technetium heptoxide. This pale-yellow, volatile solid is produced by oxidation of Tc metal and related precursors:
4 Tc + 7 O2 → 2 Tc2O7
It is a molecular metal oxide, analogous to manganese heptoxide. It adopts a centrosymmetric structure with two types of Tc−O bonds with 167 and 184 pm bond lengths.

Technetium heptoxide hydrolyzes to pertechnetate and pertechnetic acid, depending on the pH:
Tc2O7 + 2 OH− → 2 TcO4− + H2O
Tc2O7 + H2O  → 2 HTcO4

HTcO4 is a strong acid. In concentrated sulfuric acid, [TcO4]− converts to the octahedral form TcO3(OH)(H2O)2, the conjugate base of the hypothetical triaquo complex [TcO3(H2O)3]+.

Other chalcogenide derivatives
Technetium forms a dioxide, disulfide, diselenide, and ditelluride. An ill-defined Tc2S7 forms upon treating pertechnetate with hydrogen sulfide. It thermally decomposes into disulfide and elemental sulfur. Similarly the dioxide can be produced by reduction of the Tc2O7.

Unlike the case for rhenium, a trioxide has not been isolated for technetium. However, TcO3 has been identified in the gas phase using mass spectrometry.

Simple hydride and halide complexes
Technetium forms the simple complex .

The following binary (containing only two elements) technetium halides are known: TcF6, TcF5, TcCl4, TcBr4, TcBr3, α-TcCl3, β-TcCl3, TcI3, α-TcCl2, and β-TcCl2. The oxidation states range from Tc(VI) to Tc(II). Technetium halides exhibit different structure types, such as molecular octahedral complexes, extended chains, layered sheets, and metal clusters arranged in a three-dimensional network. These compounds are produced by combining the metal and halogen or by less direct reactions.

TcCl4 is obtained by chlorination of Tc metal or Tc2O7 Upon heating, TcCl4 gives the corresponding Tc(III) and Tc(II) chlorides.
TcCl4 → α-TcCl3 + 1/2 Cl2
TcCl3 → β-TcCl2 + 1/2 Cl2
The structure of TcCl4 is composed of infinite zigzag chains of edge-sharing TcCl6 octahedra. It is isomorphous to transition metal tetrachlorides of zirconium, hafnium, and platinum.

Two polymorphs of technetium trichloride exist, α- and β-TcCl3. The α polymorph is also denoted as Tc3Cl9. It adopts a confacial bioctahedral structure. It is prepared by treating the chloro-acetate Tc2(O2CCH3)4Cl2 with HCl. Like Re3Cl9, the structure of the α-polymorph consists of triangles with short M-M distances. β-TcCl3 features octahedral Tc centers, which are organized in pairs, as seen also for molybdenum trichloride. TcBr3 does not adopt the structure of either trichloride phase. Instead it has the structure of molybdenum tribromide, consisting of chains of confacial octahedra with alternating short and long Tc—Tc contacts. TcI3 has the same structure as the high temperature phase of TiI3, featuring chains of confacial octahedra with equal Tc—Tc contacts.

Several anionic technetium halides are known. The binary tetrahalides can be converted to the hexahalides [TcX6]2− (X = F, Cl, Br, I), which adopt octahedral molecular geometry. More reduced halides form anionic clusters with Tc–Tc bonds. The situation is similar for the related elements of Mo, W, Re. These clusters have the nuclearity Tc4, Tc6, Tc8, and Tc13. The more stable Tc6 and Tc8 clusters have prism shapes where vertical pairs of Tc atoms are connected by triple bonds and the planar atoms by single bonds. Every technetium atom makes six bonds, and the remaining valence electrons can be saturated by one axial and two bridging ligand halogen atoms such as chlorine or bromine.

Coordination and organometallic complexes
 ("Cardiolite") is widely used for imaging of the heart.]]
Technetium forms a variety of coordination complexes with organic ligands. Many have been well-investigated because of their relevance to nuclear medicine.

Technetium forms a variety of compounds with Tc–C bonds, i.e. organotechnetium complexes. Prominent members of this class are complexes with CO, arene, and cyclopentadienyl ligands. The binary carbonyl Tc2(CO)10 is a white volatile solid. In this molecule, two technetium atoms are bound to each other; each atom is surrounded by octahedra of five carbonyl ligands. The bond length between technetium atoms, 303 pm, is significantly larger than the distance between two atoms in metallic technetium (272 pm). Similar carbonyls are formed by technetium's congeners, manganese and rhenium. Interest in organotechnetium compounds has also been motivated by applications in nuclear medicine. Technetium also forms aquo-carbonyl complexes, one prominent complex being [Tc(CO)3(H2O)3]+, which are unusual compared to other metal carbonyls.

See also
 Molybdenum compounds
 Manganese

References

Technetium
Technetium compounds
Chemical compounds by element